The 2015–16 Minnesota Golden Gophers women's basketball team represented the University of Minnesota in the 2015–16 college basketball season. Led by second year head coach Marlene Stollings for the Golden Gophers, members of the Big Ten Conference, played their home games at Williams Arena in Minneapolis, Minnesota. They finished the season 20–12, 11–7 in Big Ten play to finish in fifth place. They lost in the second round in the Big Ten women's tournament to Northwestern. They were invited to the Women's National Invitation Tournament where they defeated Milwaukee in the first round before losing to South Dakota in the second round.

Roster

Schedule and results

|-
! colspan="9" style="text-align: center; background:#800000"|Non conference regular season

|-
! colspan="9" style="text-align: center; background:#800000"|Big Ten regular season

|-
! colspan="9" style="text-align: center; background:#800000"|Big Ten Women's Tournament

|-
! colspan="9" style="text-align: center; background:#800000"|WNIT

Source

Rankings

See also
2015–16 Minnesota Golden Gophers men's basketball team

References

Minnesota Golden Gophers women's basketball seasons
Minnesota
2016 Women's National Invitation Tournament participants
Minnesota Golden
Minnesota Golden